National Cyber and Crypto Agency (abbreviated as BSSN), is Indonesia's primary signal intelligence agency, as well cyber intelligence, cyber threat intelligence, cyber defense, and cyber security agency.

History 
The foundation of National Cyber and Crypto Agency is not separated from two preceding agencies, National Crypto Agency (Indonesian: Lembaga Sandi Negara, literally: "State Signal Agency", abbreviated as Lemsaneg) and Cyber Information Defense and Security Desk (Indonesian: Desk Ketahanan dan Keamanan Informasi Cyber Nasional, abbreviated as DK2ICN).

Lembaga Sandi Negara (Lemsaneg) 
Lemsaneg was the primary signal intelligence agency of Indonesia. It was founded by Lieutenant Colonel (then finally attained final rank Major General) Dr. Roebiono Kertopati, a medical doctor assigned in Indonesia's intelligence department at that time, Section B of Ministry of Defence. At that time, this section mainly responsible to make strategic intelligence analysis for war purposes. He was assigned to the department by Amir Sjarifuddin, Ministry of Defence at that time, to built a unit for signal intelligence. On 4 April 1946, Code Service (Indonesian: Dinas Code) founded. As a medical doctor, he did not have any background and formal training in intelligence and signal intelligence. However, during the war time and his assignment, he completed various crash courses in intelligence and signal intelligence. In 1949, during Dutch-Indonesian Round Table Conference period, he completed signal intelligence course from Dutch Ministry of Foreign Affairs. Although just gaining knowledge from the courses, with his intelligence, intuition, logics, book readings, and imagination, he finally able to make his own cryptography methods. His cryptography methods proved useful to secure transmission of secret messages and government communications, during the wartime and peacetime.

On 2 September 1949, the Code Service renamed as Crypto Bureau (Indonesian: Djawatan Sandi (old spelling), Jawatan Sandi (new spelling)), thru Ministry of Defense Decree No. 11/MP/1949, and placed under the Ministry of Defense. On 16 January 1950, based from Presidential Decree No. 65/1950, Crypto Bureau separated from the Ministry of Defense to directly under the Office of The Prime Minister of Indonesia. 

1965 was hard year for intelligence in Indonesia. During that time, Communist Party of Indonesia (Indonesian: Partai Komunis Indonesia, abbreviated as PKI) was at its peak. Dr. Soebandrio, Foreign Minister of Indonesia and Chief of Indonesian Central Intelligence Agency (Indonesian: Badan Pusat Intelijen, abbreviated as BPI; predecessor of Indonesian State Intelligence Agency) was highly influenced by PKI and most BPI agents were recruited from PKI cadres. Due to this, Indonesian intelligence community at that time was not neutral and intelligence becoming tools for politicians to commit "political intelligence" against groups considered Anti-Sukarno and Anti-Soebandrio. BPI at that time very powerful, its power can influence even intelligence under armed forces, police, and attorney general. After failed G30S/PKI coup attempt, clearance tests launched to all people in Crypto Bureau and the result declared that Crypto Bureau was clean and free from communist influence.

On 22 February 1972, thru Presidential Decree No. 7/1972, Crypto Bureau renamed as National Crypto Agency (Indonesian: Lembaga Sandi Negara, literally: State Signal Agency, abbreviated as Lemsaneg). Since then the name carried out until 2017.

Desk Ketahanan dan Keamanan Informasi Cyber Nasional (DK2ICN) 
DK2ICN was a coordinating desk under 7th Deputy (Coordination of Communication, Information, and Apparatuses) of Coordinating Ministry for Political, Legal, and Security Affairs. The desk created thru Coordinating Ministry for Political, Legal, and Security Affairs Decree No. 24/2014. The coordination desk was a consortium and membered by representatives from: Coordinating Ministry for Political, Legal, and Security Affairs, Agency of Assessment and Application of Technology (Indonesian: Badan Pengkajian dan Penerapan Teknologi, abbreviated as BPPT), Indonesian Telematic Society (Indonesian: Masyarakat Telematika Indonesia, abbreviated as Mastel), Association of Indonesia Internet Provider (Indonesian: Asosiasi Penyedia Jasa Internet Indonesia, abbreviated as APJII), Indonesian Internet Domain Name Registry (Indonesian: Pengelola Nama Domain Internet Indonesia, abbreviated as PANDI), and independents.

Along with the decree, the proposal of future National Cyber Agency (Indonesian: Badan Cyber Nasional, abbreviated as BCN) drafted by National Security Council (Indonesian: Dewan Ketahanan Nasional, abbreviated as Wantannas) also included. Until the agency formed, DK2ICN still activated to carry out the cyber defense and cyber intelligence function.

Predecessor of DK2ICN was National Cyber Security Desk (Indonesian: Desk Keamanan Siber Nasional, abbreviated as DKSN) under Wantannas in 2013. DK2ICN itself later renamed as National Cyberspace Desk (Desk Cyberspace Nasional, abbreviated as DCN) under Coordinating Ministry for Political, Legal, and Security Affairs in 2016.

State cyber activities in pre-BSSN period 
Prior BSSN existed, state cyber activities were carried out by Armed Forces (Strategic Intelligence Agency, Badan Intelijen Strategis/BAIS and Cyber Operations Unit), Police (Directorate of Cyber Crime of Criminal Investigation Agency), State Intelligence Agency (Deputy VI), Coordinating Ministry for Political, Legal, and Security Affairs (7th Deputy), Ministry of Defense (Cyber Defense Center), Ministry of Communication and Information Technology (Directorate of Informatics Application Control, Directorate of Information Security, and ID-SIRTII/CC), Ministry of Foreign Affairs (Directorate of Diplomatic Security of General Directorate Public Information and Diplomatics), and each ministry's Computer Security Incident Response Team (CSIRT). Each agency have its own interest and function, but mainly for security purposes and protecting their own cyber infrastructure.

Formation of BSSN 

Joko Widodo, however, seems unpleased with BCN proposal. He thinked that proposed BCN still lacking something important: infrastructure and human resources. Due to infeasibility of the formation of a new agency such as BCN, he later chose to upgraded Lemsaneg, which have preexisting infrastructures and readily available human resources. He subsequently combined Lemsaneg and DK2ICN into new agency: BSSN. On 19 May 2017, Presidential Decree No. 53/2017, the constituting document of BSSN signed by him. The decree also ordered that Ministry of Communication and Information Technology's Directorate of Information Security, and ID-SIRTII/CC to be handed to BSSN to provide BSSN access to state IT infrastructure security and state network protection. The decree, however, decreed that the BSSN become subordinate of Coordinating Ministry for Political, Legal, and Security Affairs for temporary for coordinating purposes. On 16 December 2017, he signed Presidential Decree No.133/2017. The decree taking out the BSSN from Coordinating Ministry for Political, Legal, and Security Affairs to be directed under the President.

Organization Structure 
Latest organization structure of BSSN was established thru Presidential Decree No. 28/2021. The structure later expanded by Chief of BSSN Decree No. 6/2021.

 Office of The Chief of BSSN
 Office of The Vice Chief of BSSN
 Main Secretariat
Bureau of Planning and Finance
Bureau of Organization and Human Resource
Bureau of Law Affairs and Public Communication
Division of Strategic Support and Central Leadership Administration
Sub Division of Administration of the Office of The Chief of BSSN
Sub Division of Administration of the Office of The Vice Chief of BSSN
Sub Division of Administration of the Office of Main Secretariat of BSSN
Sub Division of Administration of the Office of Deputy I
Sub Division of Administration of the Office of Deputy II
Sub Division of Administration of the Office of Deputy III
Sub Division of Administration of the Office of Deputy IV
Bureau of General Affairs
Household and State Property Section
Sub Division of Household Affairs and Security 
Goods/Services Procurement Section 
 Deputy of Cyber Security and Signal Intelligence Strategy and Policy (Deputy I)
Directorate of Cyber Security and Signal Intelligence Strategy
Directorate of Cyber Security and Signal Intelligence Policies on Government Affairs
Directorate of Cyber Security and Signal Intelligence Policies on Technological Affairs
Directorate of Cyber Security and Signal Intelligence Policies on Human Resource Affairs
 Deputy of Cyber Security and Signal Intelligence Operations (Deputy II)
Directorate of Cyber Security Operations
Directorate of Information Security and Control Operations
Directorate of Signal Intelligence
 Deputy of Cyber Security and Signal Intelligence for Government and Human Resource Development (Deputy III)
Directorate of Central Government Affairs on Cyber Security and Signal Intelligence 
Directorate of Regional Governments Affairs on Cyber Security and Signal Intelligence
Directorate of Cyber Security and Signal Intelligence Human Resource Development
 Deputy of Cyber Security and Signal Intelligence in Economy (Deputy IV)
Directorate of Cyber Security and Signal Intelligence for Finance, Trading, and Tourism Affairs
Directorate of Cyber Security and Signal Intelligence for Energy and Natural Resources Affairs
Directorate of Cyber Security and Signal Intelligence for Information Technology, Communication, Media, and Transportation Affairs
Directorate of Cyber Security and Signal Intelligence for Industrial Affairs
 Office of Inspectorate General
 Centers
Center of Assessment and Development of Cyber Security and Signal Intelligence Technology
Center of Data, Information Technology, and Communication 
Center of Human Resource Development
 Technical Units
 Electronic Certification Center
 Batam Signal Detection Center
 Crypto Museum

Training 
BSSN, since was developed from Lemsaneg, it inherited Lemsaneg's primary training facility, STSN (Indonesian: Sekolah Tinggi Sandi Negara), which now become PoltekSSN (Indonesian: State Signal Polytechnics).

History 
In past, during the war time (around 1947), Dinas Code held internships for who interested to be signal intelligence practitioners and operators. During its foundation period in peace time, in 1950s - 1960s, now known as Djawatan Sandi, Djawatan Sandi was relied on Special Training Program called Pendidikan Sandiman dan Juru Sandi (English: Education of Signal Operators and Signal Expert). In 1969, the program elevated into a program called Pendidikan Ahli Sandi Gaya Baru (English: New Style Signal Expert Education). In 1973, the program later upgraded and with many resources at that time, become a school called AKSARA (Indonesian: Akademi Sandi Negara, English: State Signal Academy). The school later formally established in 1974 and gained approval by the Department of Education and Culture in 1975. AKSARA subsequently become STSN in 2002, and formally established as official state school by Presidential Decree No. 22/2003.

STSN become PoltekSSN in 2019, after Ministry of Research, Technology, and Higher Education Decree No. 03/M/I/2018 on upgrading STSN to Polytechnics. It later approved thru Ministry of State Apparatuses and Bureaucratic Reform Decree No. B/1007/M.KT.01/2019, and Chief of BSSN Decree No. 12/2019.

Aside of PoltekSSN rigorous education to train future BSSN members, BSSN also held less rigorous training for field and applied operators from another institutions. The program called Diklat Sandiman (Signal Operators Short courses), which available in 2 levels: Level II (Signal Operators) and Level I (Signal Expert).

References 

Government agencies of Indonesia
Indonesian intelligence agencies
2017 establishments in Indonesia